Denisenko is a surname. Notable people with the surname include:

Aleksey Denisenko (born 1993), Russian taekwondo practitioner
Anna Denisenko (born 1989), Belarusian women's footballer
Denis Denisenko (born 1971), Russian astronomer
Grigori Denisenko (born 2000), Russian ice hockey player
Mikhail Denisenko (1899–1949), Soviet general and Hero of the Soviet Union